Shirley Owens-Hicks is an American Democratic politician from Boston, Massachusetts. She represented the 6th Suffolk district in the Massachusetts House of Representatives from 1987 to 2006, first winning her seat by primarying incumbent Royal Bolling Jr. Prior to that she served as a member of the Boston School Committee from 1984 to 1988. Her brother, Bill Owens, served in the Massachusetts Senate.

See also
 1987-1988 Massachusetts legislature
 1989-1990 Massachusetts legislature
 1991-1992 Massachusetts legislature
 1993-1994 Massachusetts legislature
 1995-1996 Massachusetts legislature
 1997-1998 Massachusetts legislature
 1999-2000 Massachusetts legislature
 2001-2002 Massachusetts legislature
 2003-2004 Massachusetts legislature
 2005-2006 Massachusetts legislature

References

Year of death missing
Members of the Massachusetts House of Representatives
Women state legislators in Massachusetts
20th-century American women politicians
20th-century American politicians
Politicians from Boston
Boston University alumni
Harvard Graduate School of Education alumni
1942 births